RFA Blue Ranger (A157) was a fleet support tanker of the Royal Fleet Auxiliary. She was launched by Harland & Wolff from their Govan yard on 29 January 1941 and served until June 1966 when she was laid up in reserve at Devonport. In January 1972 she was sold commercially and renamed Korytsa. The ship was scrapped at Aliaga in September 1987.

References

Ranger-class tankers
1941 ships
Ships built by Harland and Wolff